is a daily newspaper which is published in Sendai, Japan. The paper has been in circulation since 1897.

History and profile
Kahoku Shimpō was established in 1897. It is a local paper based in Sendai, Miyagi Prefecture. The publisher is the Kahoku Shimpo Corporation. As of 2014 Hideya Terashima was the editor of the daily which is published in broadsheet format.

Kahoku Shimpō significantly contributed to the establishment of Tohoku Imperial University in 1907 through its articles on the importance of university education in the region. From October 1945 to January 1947 the paper published Dazai Osamu's novel entitled Pandora no hako (Japanese: Pandora's Box) in sixty-four parts.

Following the 2011 earthquake the editing system of Kahoku Shimpō collapsed and story texts were sent to the Niigata Nippo newspaper.

The 1997 circulation of Kahoku Shimpō which has a liberal political leaning was about 500,000 copies. In 2003 the paper had a circulation of 624,000 copies. The morning edition of the paper had a circulation of 504,911 copies in 2007. The same year the circulation of its evening edition was 107,552 copies.

References

External links

1897 establishments in Japan
Daily newspapers published in Japan
Japanese-language newspapers
Liberal media in Japan
Mass media in Sendai
Publications established in 1897